The National sports council of Nepal (or NSC) is the governmental authentic sports organization of Nepal.  There are more than 123 sports related association and 6 federation are affiliated under it. It has the motto "sports for the health, sports for the nation". Its falls under Ministry of Youth and Sports. And the minister is official chairman of the council. Current chairman is Hon. Pushpa Kamal Dahal whereas vice chairman is Shiva Koirala "Jwala". Tanka Lal Ghising is a member secretary of National Sports Council.

Nepal participates in Olympic Games, Asian Games and South Asian Games through Nepal Olympic committee (NOC). NOC is a member of National Sports Council and also itself a sport regulatory body in Nepal. It started organizing national level sport meet since 1959.
County 
All Nepal Football Association, Cricket Association of Nepal are governing body of two popular sports in Nepal. Nepal Elephant Game Association is the governing body for the sport Elephant polo which hosted 'World Cup Elephant Polo" in Nepal. 

 Nepal National Martial Arts Games Confederation
 Nepal Full Contact Karate Federation
 Nepal Shotokan Karate Federation
 Nepal Goju-Ryu Karate Federation
 Mountain Sports Federation - Nepal

Associations

See also
Nepal Olympic Committee
All Nepal Football Association
National Games of Nepal

References

Sports
|}